Martín Andrade (July 20, 1937 - June 24, 2013) was a Chilean - Argentine actor. He starred in the 1962 film Una Jaula no tiene secretos.

Selected filmography
The Last Floor (1962)

References

External links
 
 

Argentine male film actors
Chilean male film actors
1937 births
2013 deaths